Tang-e Baha ol Dini (also Romanized as Tang-e Bahā ol Dīnī; also known as Tang-e Bahāeddīn) is a village in Howmeh Rural District, in the Central District of Larestan County, Fars Province, Iran. At the 2006 census, its population was 28, in 9 families.

References 

Populated places in Larestan County